QID is an acronym and may refer to:

  in die (q.i.d.), a medical abbreviation meaning "four times each day"
 Queen's Indian Defense, a chess opening
 Q-identifier, used in Wikidata